Arizona's 10th Legislative District is one of 30 in the state, located entirely in Pima County. As of 2021, there are 49 precincts in the district, with a total registered voter population of 140,766. The district has an overall population of 211,949.

Political representation
The district is represented for the 2021–2022 Legislative Session in the State Senate by Stephanie Stahl Hamilton (D, Tucson) and in the House of Representatives by Morgan Abraham (D) and Domingo DeGrazia (D).

References

Pima County, Arizona
Arizona legislative districts